The Pennsylvania Manual is a biennial guide to the Government of Pennsylvania produced by the Pennsylvania Department of General Services. The Pennsylvania Manual has been published by the Pennsylvania Government for over 200 years. In 2016, the 122nd volume was printed.

Editions

References

Government of Pennsylvania
Handbooks and manuals